The 2000 Australian Drivers' Championship was a CAMS sanctioned national motor racing title for drivers of cars conforming to Formula Holden regulations. The title was contested over an 8-round, 16 race series with the winner awarded the 2000 CAMS Gold Star. The championship, which was promoted as the 2000 Holden Australian Drivers' Championship, was the 44th Australian Drivers' Championship and the 12th to be contested with Formula Holden or Formula Brabham cars.

Teams and drivers

Schedule 

The championship was contested over an eight-round series with two races per round.

Points System
Championship points were awarded on a 20–15–12–10–8–6–4–3–2–1 basis to the first ten finishers in each race.

Review
New Zealand racer Simon Wills won his second Australian Drivers' Championship driving a Birrana Racing Reynard 94D Holden. Wills won eight of the 16 races to finish 33 points ahead of Singaporean born West Australian Christian Murchison (Reynard 95D & 97D). Another New Zealander, Matt Halliday (Reynard 94D Holden) finished third in the points, 58 points behind Wills. It was the sixth Australian Drivers' Championship victory in seven years for a Birrana Racing driver.

In addition to Wills' eight wins, Murchison took four race victories and Tim Leahey (Reynard 92D Holden) took two with single victories recorded by Halliday and Chris Staff (Reynard 92D Holden)

Championship results

References

Further reading
 Connor McNally, "Simply Simon", Motor Racing Australia, No 55, Dec 2000 / Jan 2001, page 44

External links
 2000 Australian Drivers' Championship results at www.teamdan.com

Drivers' Championship
Australian Drivers' Championship
Formula Holden
Australian Drivers